The County of Rochedale is a county (a cadastral division) in Queensland, Australia.  The county is divided into civil  parishes. It is centred on the city of Mount Isa, its only population centre. On 7 March 1901, the Governor issued a proclamation legally dividing Queensland into counties under the Land Act 1897. Its schedule described Rochedale thus:

Parishes

References

Rochedale